Barringtonia scortechinii grows as a tree up to  tall, with a trunk diameter of up to . The bark is brown or red. Habitat is mixed dipterocarp forest from sea-level to  altitude. B. scortechinii is found in Thailand, Malaysia, Brunei and Indonesia.

References

scortechinii
Plants described in 1901
Trees of Thailand
Trees of Sumatra
Trees of Peninsular Malaysia
Trees of Borneo